Turner Township may refer to:

 Turner Township, Arenac County, Michigan
 Turner Township, Aitkin County, Minnesota
 Turner Township, Carter County, Oklahoma
 Turner Township, McIntosh County, Oklahoma
 Turner Township, Turner County, South Dakota, in Turner County, South Dakota

See also

Turner (disambiguation)

Township name disambiguation pages